| tries = {{#expr: 
 +  6 +  3 + 13 + 13 + 10 +  1 + 11 +  6 + 12 +  8 +  7 +  3 +  2 +  2 + 10 +  5
 + 13 + 12 + 14 +  9 +  9 +  0 +  5 + 14 +  5 + 12 +  4 +  6 +  8 +  5 +  7 + 23
 +  5 +  4 +  2 +  6 +  3 +  8 +  6 +  1
 +  0 +  5 +  2 +  5 +  2 +  3 +  6 +  3
 +  7 +  4 +  5 +  4 +  4 +  0 +  2 +  8
 +  5 +  7 +  5 +  4
 + 10
}}
| top point scorer = Olly Barkley (Bath)(118 points)
| top try scorer = Tom Shanklin (Saracens)(8 tries)
| venue = Madejski Stadium, Reading
| attendance2 = 18,074
| champions =  London Wasps
| count = 1
| runner-up =  Bath Rugby
| website = https://web.archive.org/web/20080506141030/http://www.ercrugby.com/eng/
| previous year = 2001–02
| previous tournament = 2001–02 European Challenge Cup
| next year = 2003–04
| next tournament = 2003–04 European Challenge Cup
}}
The 2002–03 European Challenge Cup (known as the Parker Pen Challenge Cup for sponsorship reasons) was the 7th season of the European Challenge Cup, Europe's second tier club rugby union competition below the Heineken Cup. A total of 32 teams participated, representing eight countries.

The competition began when Gran Parma hosted Bath and Ebbw Vale hosted Montauban on 11 October 2002 and culminated in the final at the Madejski Stadium in Reading on 25 May 2003.

Unlike previous seasons, the structure of the competition was changed to a purely knockout format. Teams played each other on a home and away basis, with the aggregate points winner proceeding to the next round. The final was a single leg. For that first time, a third tier tournament was created - the European Shield. This was contested between the first-round losers from the European Challenge Cup.

The defending champions, England's Sale Sharks, did not have a chance to defend their crown because they qualified to play in the Heineken Cup. London Wasps claimed a victory over Bath in the final and picked up their first piece of European Club silverware.

Teams
The allocation of teams was as follows:
England: 6 teams – all teams from the Zurich Premiership that did not qualify for the 2002–03 Heineken Cup
France: 9 teams – all teams from the Top 16 that did not qualify for the Heineken Cup, and Agen who were banned by ERC 
Ireland: 1 team – the Irish team from the Celtic League that did not play in the Heineken Cup
Italy: 8 teams – all the teams from the Super 10 that did not qualify for the Heineken Cup
Romania: 1 team specially created for the competition 
Scotland: 1 team – the Scottish team from the Celtic League that did not play in the Heineken Cup
Spain: 2 teams – drawn from the División de Honor de Rugby
Wales: 4 teams – all the teams from the Celtic League that did not qualify for the Heineken Cup

Matches
All kickoff times are local to the match location.

Round 1

|}

First leg

Second leg

Round 2

|}

First leg

Second leg

Quarter-finals

|}

First leg

Second leg

Semi-finals

|}

First leg

Second leg

Final

See also
2002-03 Heineken Cup
European Challenge Cup
2002–03 European Shield

References

 
2002–03 rugby union tournaments for clubs
2002-03
2002–03 in European rugby union
2002–03 in English rugby union
2002–03 in French rugby union
2002–03 in Irish rugby union
2002–03 in Italian rugby union
2002–03 in Romanian rugby union
2002–03 in Welsh rugby union
2002–03 in Spanish rugby union
2002–03 in Scottish rugby union